Ascalenia vanella is a moth in the family Cosmopterigidae. It is found in Spain, France, Germany, Switzerland, Austria, Slovakia, Hungary, Greece, Crete, Italy, Sicily, Ukraine and southern Russia. It is also found on the Canary Islands and in Asia Minor.

The wingspan is 7–10.5 mm.

The larvae feed on the buds of Myricaria germanica and possibly Tamarix species.

References

Moths described in 1860
Ascalenia
Moths of Europe
Moths of Asia